The Scandinavian Journal of Occupational Therapy is a peer-reviewed medical journal covering the field of occupational therapy. It is published as 8 issues per year by Taylor & Francis and the editor-in-chief is Anita Björklund (Jönköping University).

Scandinavian Journal of Occupational Therapy welcomes original research articles such as:

 Theoretical and conceptual frameworks
Instrument development and psychometrics
Development, evaluation and implementation of interventions
Development of the profession and the subject occupational therapy and occupational science

Scandinavian Journal of Occupational Therapy accepts the following types of articles:

 Full length research articles
Case reports
Literature reviews
Short communications such as:
 Position papers
Discussion papers
Letters to the editor

Abstracting & Indexing 

The Scandinavian Journal of Occupational Therapy is indexed/tracked/covered by the following services:

 Applied Social Science Index & Abstracts
 Cumulative Index to Nursing and Allied Health Services (CINAHL)
EMCare (Elsevier)
 Ergonomics Abstracts
 Index Medicus (NLM)
MEDLINE (NLM)
 OT BibSys
 OTDBASE
Pubmed (NLM)
Pubmed Central Selective Deposit Medicine & Health (NLM)
Science Citation Index Expanded (Clarivate Analytics)
Scopus (Elsevier)
Social Science Citation Index (Clarivate Analytics)
 Swemed

References

External links 
 

Publications established in 1993
Taylor & Francis academic journals
Bimonthly journals
English-language journals
Occupational therapy journals